"When Do I Get to Sing 'My Way'" is a song by American rock band Sparks, released in October 1994 as the first single from their 16th album, Gratuitous Sax & Senseless Violins (1994). It makes reference to the Frank Sinatra signature-tune "My Way" and was a top-40 hit in the United Kingdom while peaking at number seven in Germany. In the US, it reached number nine on the Billboard Hot Dance Club Play chart. In 1995, the song was re-released, this time peaking at number 32 in the UK. It's accompanying music video was directed by British music video director Sophie Muller.

Critical reception
Ned Raggett from AllMusic complimented the song as an "surging, well-deserved European smash hit", stating that the Mael brothers "gleefully embraced the modern synth/house/techno explosion for their own purposes (an explosion which, after all, they had helped start with their work during the late '70s with Giorgio Moroder)." Larry Flick from Billboard stated that it "will provide hours of joy for hi-NRG purists with its sugar-sweet melody, rapid syncopated beats, and cheeky chorus." He also noted that Sparks "sound completely comfortable within the context of this deliciously dramatic anthem", adding that its "clever, eye-winking words are warbled with a cooing falsetto over a festive, trance-carpeted hi-NRG groove." Chuck Campbell from Knoxville News Sentinel wrote, "There's sad irony and a bit of a wink in that line [...], a Pet Shop Boys/Erasure-sounding song. For those either unfamiliar with or only vaguely aware of the act (and they far outnumber those who know very much about it), Sparks' Ron and Russell Mael were the forerunners to Britain's Pet Shop Boys and Erasure. This way IS their way." 

A reviewer from Liverpool Echo described it as a "chirpy, melodic disco track with its tongue in its cheek", and noted that it "even mentions Sid Vicious." Howard Cohen from Herald-Journal said the tune "features a great hook, a throbbing dance pulse and lush harmonizing. Think the Pet Shop Boys gone silly, or Erasure with warmth." James Masterton said it is "probably the most glorious sight seen in the charts for a long time." He added that "When Do I Get to Sing 'My Way'" is "as classic a record as they have ever made", and "a record that is better than anything those two have made in ages." Pan-European magazine Music & Media noted that it "has them sounding like a cross between Alphaville and Pet Shop Boys." An editor, Robbert Tilli, deemed it "a clear compromise to musical tastes of both original fans and today's trendy kids."

Chart performance
"When Do I Get to Sing 'My Way'" was a hit on the chart in several European countries, reaching the top 10 in Germany, where it peaked at number seven. It is also their highest charting single in Germany. Additionally, it peaked within the top 20 in Belgium and Finland, and the top 30 in Switzerland. In the UK, the single peaked at number 32 in its second run on the UK Singles Chart, on May 14, 1995. On the Eurochart Hot 100, it reached number 49 in March 1995. Outside Europe, it was successful on the US Billboard Hot Dance Club Play chart, where it peaked at number nine.

Music video
A witty black-and-white music video was made for the song in a 1940s Hollywood film noir-style tale of jealousy and lust. It was directed by British music video director Sophie Muller and released on October 17. She would also be directing the video for the band's next single, "When I Kiss You (I Hear Charlie Parker Playing)".

Impact and legacy
Treblezine included "When Do I Get to Sing 'My Way'" in their A History of Synth-Pop in 50 Essential Tracks. They wrote,

"Rarely declining a chance to inflict a puncture wound in grandeur’s rib cage, Sparks delivered an unforeseeably moving synth-pop response to the most narcissistic pop anthem in music history (not counting “I’m Too Sexy,” which was an intentional joke). Mirroring “My Way”‘s catalog of hard-won victories, Russell Mael counts off a rash of difficult close losses and mild humiliations with clever, but not mocking, anguish. Mael reflects on the un-specialness of it all over a consistent electro-pulse: “Sign your name with an X, mow the lawn.” What reads as a self-aware joke on paper winds up being a far-reaching realization, more universal than its source material, and one of Sparks’ all-time best songs. Regrets, you’ll have a ton."

American alternative rock/punk rock band Redd Kross covered the song in 2019. Ron Mael, a fan of Redd Kross, said, “To do a version of that song with a completely different musical approach from the original while keeping every ounce of the original sentiment was an amazing feat. I love it!”

Track listing
 CD single, UK
 "When Do I Get to Sing 'My Way'" (Sparks radio edit) – 3:45
 "When Do I Get to Sing 'My Way'" (Vince Clarke remix) – 4:37
 "When Do I Get to Sing 'My Way'" (Vince Clarke extended mix) – 5:24
 "When Do I Get to Sing 'My Way'" (Pro-Gress Mix V.10.3) – 7:58
 "When Do I Get to Sing 'My Way'" (Microbots) – 5:38

Charts

Weekly charts

Year-end charts

References

External links
 Sparks on Discogs

1994 singles
1994 songs
1995 singles
American house music songs
American synth-pop songs
Black-and-white music videos
Logic Records singles
Music videos directed by Sophie Muller
Songs written by Ron Mael
Songs written by Russell Mael
Sparks (band) songs
Techno songs